Juan Cruz Cigudosa García (born 1964) is a Navarrese politician, Minister of University, Innovation and Digital Transformation of Navarre since August 2019.

References

1964 births
Spanish Socialist Workers' Party politicians
Government ministers of Navarre
Living people
Politicians from Navarre